Nireus is a name that may refer to:

Nireus (Νιρεύς), in Greek mythology:
Nireus, king of Syme
Nireus, a son of Poseidon and Canace
Nireus, a companion of Heracles
173086 Nireus, an asteroid
Nireus, a Type 209 submarine of the Hellenic Navy
Papilio nireus, a species of butterfly